Fernando Richeri (born 9 June 1948) is a Uruguayan sports shooter. He competed in the men's 10 metre air pistol event at the 1992 Summer Olympics.

References

1948 births
Living people
Uruguayan male sport shooters
Olympic shooters of Uruguay
Shooters at the 1992 Summer Olympics
Place of birth missing (living people)
20th-century Uruguayan people